The 1889 Invercargill mayoral election was held on 27 November 1889.

Former mayor John Walker Mitchell defeated James Mackintosh.

Results
The following table gives the election results:

References

1889 elections in New Zealand
Mayoral elections in Invercargill